Sonia Aktar Tumba (born 15 July 1997) is a Bangladeshi competitive swimmer.

She competed at the 2016 Summer Olympics in Rio de Janeiro, in the women's 50 metre freestyle, where she ranked at #69 with a time of 29.99 seconds. She did not advance to the semifinal.

In 2022, she represented Bangladesh at the World Aquatics Championships held in Budapest, Hungary.

References

External links
 

1997 births
Living people
Bangladeshi female swimmers
Olympic swimmers of Bangladesh
Swimmers at the 2016 Summer Olympics
Bangladeshi female freestyle swimmers
South Asian Games bronze medalists for Bangladesh
South Asian Games medalists in swimming
21st-century Bangladeshi women